Sparrow's Beach was a beachfront resort on the Chesapeake Bay that catered to African American patrons during segregation in the American South.

Located just south of Annapolis, Maryland, Sparrow's Beach was established as a recreational area during the Jim Crow-era when African-Americans were denied entry into 'Whites-only' establishments. Other nearby beachfront resorts used for this purpose included Carr's Beach, Elktonia Beach, Bembe Beach, Highland Beach, Venice Beach, Oyster Harbor, and Arundel-on-the-Bay.

In August 2022, the City of Annapolis purchased what remains of Sparrow's Beach, Carr's Beach, and Elktonia Beach to preserve the land as a park.

History 
Frederick Carr and Mary Wells Carr purchased 180 acres of waterfront property on the Annapolis Neck peninsula in 1902. In 1926, they established a beachfront resort called Carr's Beach on the land. Their daughter, Elizabeth Carr Smith, operated Carr's Beach. Their other daughter, Florence Carr Sparrow (1890-1989), established neighboring Sparrow's Beach on the land in 1931.

Sparrow's beach operated for about forty years.

Legacy and preservation 
In August 2022, the City of Annapolis acquired five bay-front acres that included the remains of Carr's Beach, Sparrow's Beach, and Elktonia Beach. The acquisition was a result of collaborative efforts of the Blacks of the Chesapeake Foundation, Chesapeake Conservancy, the City of Annapolis, the State of Maryland, and The Conservation Fund.

The site will be preserved for use as a public park.

References 

Annapolis, Maryland
Historic sites in Maryland
African-American history in Annapolis, Maryland